Philornis is a genus of around 50 species of fly (Diptera, Muscidae) from Central and South America. Their larvae are subcutaneous parasites of nestling birds. They are sometimes referred to as "bot flies" (e.g. ), though they are not related to true bot flies (family Oestridae).

Two species are also found in the southern United States. One species, P. downsi, has been accidentally introduced to the Galapagos Archipelago, posing a major threat to some of its endemic birds.

They parasitize a wide range of bird species including psittacines. A study in the Peruvian Amazon compared parasite prevalence among different nests of scarlet macaws at the Tambopata research site, to see whether any of the nest types resulted in higher infestation. Parasite prevalence was significantly lower in natural nest hollows than in artificial nest boxes. The most extreme intensity was 63 larvae per chick, which is higher than those found for other Neotropical parrots. The study also described a new and efficient technique to remove larvae using a reverse syringe design snake bite extractor.

Species
 
Philornis aitkeni Dodge, 1963
Philornis albuquerquei Couri, 1983
Philornis amazonensis Couri, 1983
Philornis angustifrons (Loew, 1861)
Philornis bella Couri, 1984
Philornis blanchardi García, 1952
Philornis carinata Dodge, 1968
Philornis cinnamomina (Stein, 1918)
Philornis deceptiva (Dodge & Aitken, 1968)
Philornis diminuta Couri, 1984
Philornis downsi (Dodge & Aitken, 1968)
Philornis falsifica (Dodge & Aitken, 1968)
Philornis fasciventris (Wulp, 1896)
Philornis frontalis Couri, 1984
Philornis fumicosta Dodge, 1968
Philornis gagnei Couri, 1983
Philornis glaucinis Dodge & Aitken, 1968
Philornis grandis Couri, 1984
Philornis insularis Couri, 1983
Philornis isla Couri, 2000
Philornis lopesi Couri, 1983
Philornis masoni Couri, 1986
Philornis mediana Couri, 1984
Philornis mima (Townsend, 1927)
Philornis mimicola Dodge, 1968
Philornis molesta Meinert, 1890)
Philornis nielseni Dodge, 1968
Philornis niger Dodge & Aitken, 1968
Philornis obscura (Wulp, 1896)
Philornis obscurinervis Couri, 1984
Philornis petersoni Couri, 1984
Philornis porteri Dodge, 1955
Philornis querula Dodge & Aitken, 1968
Philornis rettenmeyeri Dodge, 1963
Philornis ruforscutellaris Couri, 1983
Philornis sabroskyi Albuquerque, 1957
Philornis sanguinis Dodge & Aitken, 1968
Philornis schildi Dodge, 1963
Philornis seguyi García, 1952
Philornis setinervis Dodge, 1963
Philornis sperophila (Townsend, 1895)
Philornis torquans (Nielsen, 1913)
Philornis trinitensis Dodge & Aitken, 1968
Philornis umanani García, 1952
Philornis univittata Dodge, 1968
Philornis vespidicola Dodge, 1968
Philornis vulgaris Couri, 1984
Philornis zeteki Dodge, 1963

References 

Parasites of birds
Parasitic flies
Ectoparasites
Muscidae
Brachycera genera
Taxa named by Frederik Vilhelm August Meinert